Memorandum van een dokter is a Dutch television series based on A. J. Cronin's stories about the fictional hero, Dr. Finlay.  The series was broadcast from 1963 to 1965 and was directed by Peter Holland.  It starred Bram van der Vlugt as Dr. Finlay, Rob Geraerds as Dr. Cameron, and Fien Berghegge as Janet.

External links 

Medical television series
1963 Dutch television series debuts
1965 Dutch television series endings
Television shows based on British novels
Period television series
Television shows based on works by A. J. Cronin
Dutch drama television series
1960s Dutch television series
Black-and-white Dutch television shows